The Belmont Formation is a geologic formation in Grenada. It preserves fossils dating back to the Burdigalian period.

See also 
 List of fossiliferous stratigraphic units in Grenada

References

Further reading 
 P. Jung. 1971. Fossil mollusks from Carriacou, West Indies. Bulletins of American Paleontology 61(269):1-262
 B. Landau and C. Marques da Silva. 2010. Early Pliocene gastropods of Cubagua, Venezuela: Taxonomy, palaeobiogeography and ecostratigraphy. Palaeontos 19:1-221 
 H. G. Richards, R. T. Abbott, and T. Skymer. 1969. The marine Pleistocene mollusks of Bermuda. Notulae Naturae 425:1-10

Geologic formations of the Caribbean
Geology of Grenada
Neogene Caribbean
Burdigalian
Siltstone formations
Sandstone formations
Deep marine deposits